The Netherlands competed at the 1920 Summer Olympics in Antwerp, Belgium. 130 competitors, 129 men and 1 woman, took part in 58 events in 15 sports.

Medalists

Gold
Piet de Brouwer, Joep Packbiers, Janus Theeuwes, Driekske van Bussel, Jo van Gastel, Tiest van Gestel, Janus van Merrienboer, and Theo Willems — Archery, Men's Team Competition
Maurice Peeters — Cycling, Men's 1.000m Sprint (Scratch) 
Cornelis Hin, Frans Hin, and Johan Hin — Sailing, Men's Dinghy
Berend Carp, Joop Carp, and Petrus Wernink — Sailing, Men's 6½ Meter Class

Silver
Wilhelmus Bekkers, Johannes Hengeveld, Sytse Jansma, Henk Janssen, Antonius van Loon, Willem van Loon, Marinus van Rekum, and Willem van Rekum — Tug of War, Men's Team Competition
Petrus Beukers and Arnoud van der Biesen — Sailing, Men's Dinghy

Bronze
Piet Ikelaar — Cycling, Men's 50 km Track Race
Frans de Vreng and Piet Ikelaar — Cycling, Men's 2.000m Tandem
Arie de Jong — Fencing, Men's Sabre Individual
Arie de Jong, Louis Delaunoij, Jetze Doorman, Willem van Blijenburgh, Jan van der Wiel, Henri Wijnoldij-Daniëls, and Salomon Zeldenrust — Fencing, Men's Sabre Team
Arie Bieshaar, Leo Bosschart, Evert Bulder, Jaap Bulder, Jan de Natris, Harry Dénis, Ber Groosjohan, Frits Kuipers, Dick MacNeill, Henk Steeman, Jan van Dort, Oscar van Rappard, Ben Verweij, and Felix von Heijden — Football (soccer), Men's Team Competition

Aquatics

Swimming

Four swimmers, including one woman, represented the Netherlands in 1920. It was the nation's debut in the sport. None of the swimmers advanced to an event final.

Ranks given are within the heat.

 Men

 Women

Water polo

The Netherlands competed in the Olympic water polo tournament for the second time in 1920. A modified version of the Bergvall System was in use at the time. The Netherlands lost 2–1 to Belgium in the quarterfinals. Because Belgium eventually finished with the silver medal, the Dutch had a chance to play for the bronze. In the bronze medal quarterfinals, they defeated Czechoslovakia. They fell to Sweden in the bronze semifinals, however.
Squad

 Quarterfinals

 Bronze medal quarterfinals

 Bronze medal semifinals

 Final rank 5th

Archery

The Netherlands sent eight archers in its second Olympic archery appearance. The Dutch archers competed in a single event, the team moving bird at 28 metres. Facing off against a Belgian team and a French team, the Netherlands squad took the gold medal.

Athletics

11 athletes represented the Netherlands in 1920. It was the nation's third appearance in athletics. Paulen's seventh-place finish in the 800 metres was the country's best result in the sport to date.

Ranks given are within the heat.

Boxing 

Eight boxers represented Netherlands at the 1920 Games. It was the nation's debut in boxing. None of the boxers made it past the quarterfinals.

Cycling

Ten cyclists represented the Netherlands in 1920. It was the nation's second appearance in the sport. Peeters won the sprint event. Ikelaar took the bronze in the 50 kilometres, and added another bronze along with de Vreng in the tandem. The three medals were the first Olympic cycling medals for the Netherlands, and put the country in third place in the cycling leaderboard for the Games.

Road cycling

Track cycling

Ranks given are within the heat.

Equestrian

A single equestrian represented the Netherlands in 1920. It was the nation's debut in the sport. Sirtema competed in the individual eventing competition, finishing in 20th place.

Fencing

Ten fencers represented the Netherlands in 1920. It was the nation's fourth appearance in the sport. The country's best results were in the sabre competitions. De Jong won the bronze medal in the individual event and two others reached the final; it was the only individual event in which the team had any finalists. The sabre team also captured a bronze medal.

Ranks given are within the group.

Football

The Netherlands competed in the Olympic football tournament for the third time, winning its third straight bronze medal. The team had a fairly easy win over Luxembourg in the first round before requiring extra time to defeat Sweden in the quarterfinals. In the semifinals, the Netherlands lost to eventual gold-medalist Belgium. This relegated the Dutch team to the consolation tournament for silver; they received a bye into the consolation final when France turned out to have left the Olympics. In the match for silver and bronze, the Netherlands were defeated by Spain to finish in third place.

 First round

 Quarterfinals

 Semifinals

 Consolation final

Final rank  Bronze

Rowing

Twelve rowers represented the Netherlands in 1920. It was the nation's third appearance in the sport. None of the three Dutch boats advanced to the finals.

Ranks given are within the heat.

Sailing

Eight sailors represented the Netherlands in 1920. It was the nation's second appearance in the sport. The Dutch had their best possible result, with two gold medals and one silver. The two Dutch 12-footers were the only boats to contest that event, while the 6½ metre team defeated a French boat.

Shooting

Fifteen shooters represented the Netherlands in 1920. It was the nation's fourth appearance in the sport. Klaas Jan Pen competed, but it is not known in which event.

Tug of war

The Netherlands competed in the Olympic tug of war tournament for the first time in 1920, the final appearance of the sport in the Olympics. The Bergvall System was used in 1920. The Dutch beat Italy in the semifinals to advance to the final against Great Britain. There they lost to the British, and had to continue in the silver medal rounds. The Netherlands received a bye into the silver medal finals, where they beat Belgium to take the silver.

All matches were best-of-three pulls.

 Semifinals

 Final

 Silver medal match

 Final rank  Silver

Weightlifting

Five weightlifters represented the Netherlands in 1920. It was the nation's debut in the sport. Ringelberg's fourth-place finish was the best of the year for the Dutch weightlifters.

Wrestling

Nine wrestlers, all in the Greco-Roman discipline, competed for the Netherlands in 1920. It was the nation's third appearance in the sport. The Dutch wrestlers won no medals, but came close in a few instances. The format turned out to be particularly unfortunate for Jan Sint, who advanced to the final in the light heavyweight but finished without a medal after being defeated by Johansson in the final and losing again in the silver medal semifinal. Jaap Sjouwerman advanced to the heavyweight semifinals, but did not get a chance to compete for silver or bronze after his semifinal loss to an opponent who did not win gold or silver.

Greco-Roman

Demonstration sports

Korfball

Organized by the Dutch Korfball Association, two Dutch teams gave a korfball demonstration, with a match on 22 August in the Olympisch Stadion.

References

External links
 
 
International Olympic Committee results database
Dutch Olympic Committee

Nations at the 1920 Summer Olympics
1920
Olympics